Emily Rose Eavis (born July 1979) is co-organiser of the annual Glastonbury Festival, and the youngest daughter of the festival's founder and organiser Michael Eavis and his second wife Jean.

Early life
Eavis grew up on Worthy Farm, Somerset, the site of the Glastonbury Festival. In 1985, at age five, she performed Twinkle, Twinkle, Little Star on the Festival's Pyramid Stage immediately before The Style Council headlined. After leaving Wells Cathedral School in 1997, she began a teaching degree at Goldsmiths University, London. When her mother became ill with cancer, Eavis deferred her course and returned home to care for her.

Music events career

Glastonbury
Following her mother's death in 1999, Eavis began assisting her father in running the festival and became co-organiser of the event. She is now responsible for overseeing the line-up of the festival. In 2007, Eavis created The Park area with her partner, music manager Nick Dewey. In 2008, Eavis booked the festival's first hip hop headliner, Jay-Z. Eavis married Dewey in August 2009; the couple have three children, sons born in 2011 and 2013 and a daughter born in 2016. The couple is responsible for booking all of Glastonbury's main stages, with Dewey now the festival's Head of Music Programming. Other headliners Eavis and Dewey have booked include The Rolling Stones, Adele, Bruce Springsteen, Beyoncé, Stevie Wonder, Dolly Parton, Kanye West, Neil Young, Lionel Richie, Blur, Paul Simon, Arctic Monkeys, Electric Light Orchestra, Radiohead, Foo Fighters and Ed Sheeran. Eavis has also booked African and Middle Eastern artists on the Pyramid Stage. including Amadou & Mariam, Rokia Traore, Bassekou Kouyate, Songhoy Blues, Baaba Maal and Syrian National Orchestra for Arabic Music.

Other events
Eavis has organised several fundraising concerts for Oxfam, including a Make Trade Fair concert at London's Astoria in October 2002 with Coldplay, Noel Gallagher and Ms Dynamite and a show at the Hammersmith Apollo in September 2004 headlined by REM. Eavis also organised a concert opposing the Iraq war at the Shepherd's Bush Empire in 2003, featuring Coldplay, Paul Weller, Faithless and Ronan Keating.

Views
Eavis has advocated female equality in music and equal representation across stages at Glastonbury. She also supports the White Ribbon Alliance. In 2019, Eavis was behind Glastonbury's decision to ban the sale of single-use plastic bottles at that year's festival in a bid to cut waste.

See also
Music industry
Music management
Promoter (entertainment)
Woodstock

References

External links

1979 births
Living people
People from Mendip District
People educated at Wells Cathedral School
Glastonbury Festival
People educated at Bruton School for Girls
21st-century English businesswomen
21st-century English businesspeople
Music promoters
English patrons of music
Women music promoters